Stroxton is a village in the South Kesteven district of Lincolnshire, England.

At one time Stroxton was a civil parish but in 1931 the parish was merged with nearby Little Ponton to form the parish of Little Ponton and Stroxton .

The village comprises 15 households. The parish church is dedicated to All Saints.

References

External links

Stroxton

Villages in Lincolnshire
Former civil parishes in Lincolnshire
South Kesteven District